Megan Evans is a Melbourne based visual artist known for her works about Australian colonisation. She graduated from Victoria University of Technology with a PhD in 2003. Evans describes herself as an interdisciplinary artist. Her work is held in a number of collections, including the National Gallery of Australia and the Art Gallery of Ballarat. She won the Footscray Art Prize in 2019 for her work, PARLOUR.

References

External links 
Official site
Northcote Koori Mural Project, Museum Victoria
Megan Evans, Owning Her Colonial Past

Living people
21st-century Australian women artists
21st-century Australian artists
Artists from Melbourne
Year of birth missing (living people)